Football Club de Melun is a football club located in Melun, France. As of the 2021–22 season, it competes in the Régional 2, the seventh tier of French football.

History 
The club was founded as US Melun in 1894.

In the 1970s and 1980s, the club competed mostly in the Division 3, but reached the Division 2 on two occasions, during the 1977–78 and 1987–88 seasons.  The second occasion the club reached the Division 2, it was as Entente Melun-Fontainebleau 77, the club that formed from a merger in 1987 between CS Fontainebleau and US Melun. However, in 1988, the Entente split, and Melun merged with Dammarie-lès-Lys to create a new club called in Sporting Melun-Dammarie 77. In 1992, the club took the new name of FC Melun and was administratively relegated several divisions.

Name changes 

 1894–1987: US Melun
 1987–1988: Entente Melun-Fontainebleau 77 (merged with CS Fontainebleau for one season)
 1988–1992: Sporting Melun-Dammarie 77 (merged with Dammarie-lès-Lys)
 1992–present: FC Melun

Notable former players 

  Arassen Ragaven
  Lilian Thuram

Honours

References 

Football clubs in France
Association football clubs established in 1894
1894 establishments in France

Sport in Seine-et-Marne
Football clubs in Île-de-France
Melun